The winners of the 1992–93 Asian Cup Winners' Cup, the association football competition run by the Asian Football Confederation, are listed below.

First round

|}
1 Sing Tao withdrew. 
2 PIA and York both withdrew; the tie was scratched.
3 Balestier withdrew. 
4 Mohammedan withdrew. 
5 Safa withdrew.

Second round

|}

1 Mohammedan were drawn against the winner of PIA and York, but both teams withdrew.

Intermediate Round

|}

Semifinals

|}
11st leg Nov 12, 2nd leg Nov 26 (other source has legs reversed and dates Nov 12 and 20) 
21st leg Nov 13, 2nd leg Nov 20

Final

|}

First Game

Second Game

References
Asian Cup Winners Cup 1993

Asian Cup Winners' Cup
2
2
Persepolis F.C. matches